DV Piscium is a triple star system in the equatorial constellation of Pisces, abbreviated DV Psc. It is an eclipsing binary variable of the RS Canum Venaticorum class. The pair have a combined apparent visual magnitude of 10.59, which is too faint to be visible with the naked eye. Based on parallax measurements, DC Piscium is located at a distance of 137.5 light years from the Sun. It is drifting closer with a radial velocity of −28 km/s.

In 1994, this target was found to show emission line features in the calcium H and K lines. It was classified as a K-type star with a high proper motion in 1986. Data from the ROSAT satellite showed significant X-ray emission. In 1999, it was shown to be a near-contact eclipsing binary star system by R. M. Robb and associates, with an orbital period of 0.30855 days. The shape of the light curve suggested the presence of one or more star spots on the cooler component. A flare event was observed on November 22, 2008, indicative of a high level of magnetic activity.

Combining photometric results across several years demonstrated that the light curve is highly variable, with star spot activity on both components. These varied over time in quantity, size, and location. This is a detached binary system with the components in near contact at a separation of just two solar radii. The primary component has 68% of the mass of the Sun and 73% of the Sun's radius; the cooler secondary has 47% of the mass and 52% of the radius of the Sun. Both components are slightly evolved main sequence stars.

This body has less than 62% of the mass of the Sun.

References

Further reading

K-type main-sequence stars
RS Canum Venaticorum variables
Eclipsing binaries
Triple star systems

Pisces (constellation)
Objects with variable star designations